Leandro Greco (born 19 July 1986) is an Italian football coach and a former player who played as a midfielder. He is an assistant coach for Serie B club Südtirol.

Career
A midfielder, Greco was a regular in the Roma youth squad. He made his Serie A debut for AS Roma in 2004–05. In 2005–06, Greco managed to make only a handful of appearances, all as a substitute player.

Verona, Pisa & Piacenza
He was farmed to Hellas Verona for the following two seasons, playing a total of 40 games (26 in his first season, 14 in his second). Verona acquired half of the registration rights in June 2007 for €300,000, but bought back by Roma in June 2008 for just €150,000.

He played the second half of 2008–09 on loan to Pisa of Serie B. His loan stint was cut short in January 2010, and Greco was successively sent to another Serie B club, Piacenza, for the remainder of the season.

Return to Roma
Greco returned to Roma for the 2010–11 season and was immediately put on transfer list, but no club showed interest in signing him, so he was placed on the first team instead. An injury crisis head coach Claudio Ranieri to bring him on the bench for a UEFA Champions League game against FC Basel, during which Greco entered as a substitute for the final 15 minutes and scored a goal only one minute after entering; the game ended in a 3–2 win for Roma. Greco's good performances led Ranieri to call him up for the Rome derby, during which he came on for injured Jérémy Menez during the first half and provided a solid performance in a 2–0 win for his side. He was promoted to the starting lineup for subsequent games against Fiorentina and Juventus.

Greco's contract was extended along with Daniele De Rossi and Simone Perrotta in February 2012. Greco signed a new 3-year contract with annual gross salary of €1.254 million plus bonuses, moreover, 2011–12 season gross salary also increased to €0.8 million.

At the start of 2012–13 Serie A, Greco was included in the pre-season camp, however he trained separately due to minor injury.

Olympiacos
In July 2012, Greek champions Olympiacos signed Greco for three years on a free transfer. He scored his first goal for the Piraeus side in the Champions League game against Montpellier HSC in a 3–1 home win.

Livorno
In July 2013, Greco returned to Italy for Livorno. On 20 June 2014, his contract with Livorno was terminated in mutual consent.

Genoa
On 20 June 2014, Leandro Greco has signed a three-year contract with the Serie A team Genoa.

Cremonese
On 6 July 2018, Greco signed a two-year contract with Serie B club Cremonese.

Foggia
On 18 January 2019, Greco joined to Foggia Calcio for a fee.

Cosenza and Perugia
On 31 August 2019, he joined Cosenza on a 1-year contract. On 31 January 2020, he signed with Perugia until the end of the season.

Südtirol
On 31 July 2020 he signed a 2-year contract with Südtirol.

Coaching career
After retirement, Greco stayed on at Südtirol as an assistant coach. On 9 August 2022, he was appointed as caretaker following the departure of Lamberto Zauli as head coach.

After being in charge of Südtirol for the first three games of the Serie B season, all ended in defeat, on 29 August 2022 Greco was ultimately relieved from his first team duties and replaced by Pierpaolo Bisoli.

Honours

Club
Olympiacos
Superleague Greece (1): 2012–13

References

External links
 Lega Serie A profile 
 

Living people
1986 births
Footballers from Rome
Association football midfielders
Italian footballers
A.S. Roma players
A.S.D. Astrea players
Hellas Verona F.C. players
Pisa S.C. players
Piacenza Calcio 1919 players
Olympiacos F.C. players
U.S. Livorno 1915 players
Genoa C.F.C. players
S.S.C. Bari players
Calcio Foggia 1920 players
U.S. Cremonese players
Cosenza Calcio players
A.C. Perugia Calcio players
F.C. Südtirol players
Serie A players
Serie B players
Serie C players
Serie D players
Super League Greece players
Italian expatriate footballers
Expatriate footballers in Greece